Pentateucha stueningi, the Chinese hirsute hawkmoth, is a species of moth of the family Sphingidae. It is known from the isolated warm temperate mountains of Zhejiang and neighbouring Anhui in south-eastern China. The habitat consists of alpine forests.

References

Sphingulini
Moths described in 1997